Wymondham High Academy is a state-funded co-educational academy school in the English county of Norfolk  It can be found near the centre of the town of Wymondham, to the west of Norwich. It has around 1,650 pupils aged 11 to 18. The principal is Mr Chris Smith.

In 2017, the Academy received a 'good' report from Ofsted.

Campus
The school is divided into 4 blocks: North (English, Geography, I.T), South (Sciences, Music, Drama), Middle (Maths, Languages, RE) and, from 2013, East (Art, History). There is also a relatively small social sciences block, used exclusively by the sixth form. Neighbouring Wymondham Leisure Centre is used for its physical education facilities.

House system
The House system was set up in 1975. There are currently four houses:

 Abbey: Named after Wymondham Abbey. House colour: purple.
 Cheshire: Named after Leonard Cheshire, founder of Leonard Cheshire Disability. House colour: yellow.
 Ellis: Named after local naturalist Ted Ellis, after whom the Ellis Foundation was named. House colour: green.
 Macmillan: Named after Douglas Macmillan, founder of Macmillan Cancer Support. House colour: red.

New history and art block
In 2012, the school received a £3 million grant from Norfolk County Council to build a new Art and History block. It was built by contractors R G Carter Ltd and was completed in July 2013, covering 1,336 sq/m in total.

Notable alumni
 Maddie Brooks, North Florida Ospreys tennis team member
 Mark Mitchell, silver medal winning figure skater

References

External links
 Wymondham High School website

Academies in Norfolk
Secondary schools in Norfolk
Wymondham, Norfolk